Chicago V is the fourth studio album by American rock band Chicago and was released on July 10, 1972. It is notable for being the group's first single album release, after having released three consecutive double albums and a four-disc box set of live material.

History
Following the release of Chicago III in 1971, the group changed from producing double albums, with many songs arranged in extended suites, in favor of more concise tracks on a single album. It is often considered the group’s return-to-basics as it has a sound resembling their first album, Chicago Transit Authority. Chicago V is also notable for Robert Lamm's prolific songwriting; seven out of its nine tunes are composed solely by him. Terry Kath wrote and sang the album's final track "Alma Mater", which showcased his acoustic guitar abilities. The song "A Hit by Varèse" is a tribute to French-American composer Edgard Varèse. This would be the last album not to have any compositions from Peter Cetera during his tenure in the band.

Recorded just before Chicago at Carnegie Hall was released in late 1971, Chicago V was cut in just over a week and held over for release until the following summer.  Released shortly before the album, the single "Saturday in the Park" was the band's biggest hit to that point, reaching No. 3 in the US.  Chicago V was critically acclaimed and became Chicago's first No.1 album, spending nine weeks atop the charts in the US.  In the UK, the release managed to reach No. 24.  The follow-up single "Dialogue (Part I & II)" also became a hit, peaking at No. 24 in the US.

This album was mixed and released in both stereo and quadraphonic. In 2002, Chicago V was remastered and reissued by Rhino Records with three bonus tracks: a rehearsal of Lamm's "A Song for Richard and His Friends", which was debuted at Carnegie Hall, an early rehearsal of Kath's "Mississippi Delta City Blues" (which would later be re-recorded and released on Chicago XI), and a single edit of "Dialogue".

On August 17, 2011, Warner Japan released this album as a hybrid stereo-multichannel Super Audio CD in their Warner Premium Sound series.

Critical reception

Accolades
1973: Chicago V, Best Small-Combo LP, Playboy Jazz & Pop Poll

Track listing

Bonus track (2002 re-issue)
 "A Song for Richard and His Friends (Studio version without vocals)" (Lamm) – 8:15
 "Mississippi Delta City Blues (First recorded version with scratch vocal)" (Kath) – 5:28
 "Dialogue (Part I & II) (Single edit)" (Lamm) – 5:02

Personnel

Chicago 
 Robert Lamm – acoustic piano, Hammond organ, Fender Rhodes, Hohner Pianet, lead and backing vocals
 Terry Kath – electric and acoustic guitars, lead and backing vocals
 Peter Cetera – bass guitar, wah-wah bass, lead and backing vocals
 James Pankow – trombone, percussion, backing vocals, brass arrangements
 Walter Parazaider – saxophones, flute, percussion, backing vocals
 Lee Loughnane – trumpet, flugelhorn, percussion, backing vocals
 Danny Seraphine – drums, congas, antique bells, percussion

Production 
 Produced by James William Guercio
 Engineered by Wayne Tarnowski
 Logo Design – Nick Fasciano
 Album Design – John Berg
 Photography – Jim Houghton and Earl Steinbicker
 Lettering – Beverly Scott
 Remastering – Joe Gastwirt

Charts

Certifications

References

Chicago (band) albums
1972 albums
Albums produced by James William Guercio
Columbia Records albums
Albums recorded at CBS 30th Street Studio